Coco Gauff was the defending champion, but chose not to participate this year.

Aryna Sabalenka won the title, defeating her doubles partner Elise Mertens in the final, 7–5, 6–2.

Seeds

Draw

Finals

Top half

Bottom half

Qualifying

Seeds

Qualifiers

Lucky loser
 Katarina Zavatska

Draw

First qualifier

Second qualifier

Third qualifier

Fourth qualifier

Fifth qualifier

Sixth qualifier

References

External Links
 Main draw
 Qualifying draw
 Player list

Upper Austria Ladies Linz - Singles
Upper Austria Ladies Linz Singles